Gerd Almgren (24 September 1925 – 25 September 2008) was a Swedish journalist and film-maker. She was a television presenter for the Swedish public broadcaster and reported from the Algerian War. From her reporting in Algeria she became remembered as "Madame Courage".

Biography
Gerd Almgren was born in Uppsala County, Sweden. She was the daughter of Swedish archaeologist Oscar Almgren and Berta Almgren. Her brother was archaeologist Bertil Almgren.

Almgren attended the first television production program for national public broadcaster  Radiotjänst in 1956. Almgren reported from the Algerian War for Swedish television. She left her position with the broadcaster after giving a First of May speech, but continued reporting for Swedish television as a freelancer. 

After Algerian independence in 1962, she interviewed revolutionary leader Ahmed Ben Bella.

Works
 Gerd Almgren (1958): Kakaokust. Stockholm: Natur och kultur
 Gerd Almgren and Bosse Ringholm (1973): Jorden runt: geografi, ekonomi, politik. Stockholm: Brevskolan
 Gerd Almgren (1987): "K A Almgrens sidenväveri" i Levande textil. (Svenska turistföreningens årsbok, 1988)

References

Swedish television journalists
Women war correspondents
Swedish women television presenters
1925 births
2008 deaths
People from Uppsala